Mohammad Mobashir Rahman (born 12 March 1998), is an Indian professional footballer who plays as a midfielder for East Bengal in the Indian Super League.

Career
Born in Jamshedpur, Jharkhand, Rahman's father, Mohammad Shafique, played football for Bihar. In 2008, Rahman was offered a chance to train at the Chandigarh Football Academy but had to reject it after his parents were not sure whether to let Rahman focus on football. Two years later, Rahman convinced his parents to let him play at the Chandigarh Football Academy. He spent four years at the academy before being selected to join the Tata Football Academy in 2014. He graduated from the academy in July 2018.

Jamshedpur
On 20 September 2018, after training with Jamshedpur during their pre-season, Rahman, along with former Tata Football Academy graduates Gourav Mukhi and Vishal Das, was signed to a professional contract. He made his debut for the club on 2 October 2018 against Mumbai City. He came on as a 76th–minute substitute for Mario Arqués as Jamshedpur won 2–0.

Career statistics

Club

References

External links 
 Indian Super League profile

1998 births
Living people
People from Jamshedpur
Indian footballers
Jamshedpur FC players
Association football midfielders
Footballers from Jharkhand
Indian Super League players